"Looking Back" is a song by Aksel Kankaanranta that would have represented Finland in the Eurovision Song Contest 2020.

Eurovision Song Contest

The song would have represented Finland in the Eurovision Song Contest 2020, after Aksel Kankaanranta was selected through Uuden Musiikin Kilpailu 2020, the music competition that selects Finland's entries for the Eurovision Song Contest. On 28 January 2020, a special allocation draw was held which placed each country into one of the two semi-finals, as well as which half of the show they would perform in. Finland was placed into the second semi-final, to be held on 14 May 2020, and was scheduled to perform in the second half of the show.

References

2020 singles
2020 songs
Eurovision songs of 2020
Eurovision songs of Finland
Songs written by Joonas Angeria
Songs written by Whitney Phillips